Drysdallite is a rare molybdenum selenium sulfide mineral with formula Mo(Se,S)2. It crystallizes in the hexagonal system as small pyramidal crystals or in cleavable masses. It is an opaque metallic mineral with a Mohs hardness of 1 to 1.5 and a specific gravity of 6.25. Like molybdenite it is pliable with perfect cleavage.

It was first described in 1973 for an occurrence in an oxidized uranium deposit near Solwezi, Zambia. It was named for Alan Roy Drysdall, the director of the Zambian geological survey.

References

 Handbook of Mineralogy
 Webmineral
 Mindat

Molybdenum minerals
Sulfide minerals
Selenide minerals
Hexagonal minerals
Minerals in space group 194